Bevo may refer to:

Bevo (beverage), a non-alcoholic malt beverage brewed in the United States
Bevo (mascot), University of Texas at Austin mascot
Bevo HC, Dutch handball club
JetAfrica Swaziland (callsign BEVO), see List of airline codes
Beverly Hills, New South Wales, Australia; nicknamed "Bevo"
Bevo Howard (1914–1971), U.S. aviator
Bevo LeBourveau (1896–1947), U.S. baseball player
Bevo Francis (1932–2015), U.S. basketball player
Bevo Nordmann (1939–2015), U.S. basketball player
 Jon Bevo (musician), keyboardist for God Street Wine